Mesocacia punctifasciata is a species of beetle in the family Cerambycidae. It was described by Gressitt in 1940. It is known from China.

References

Mesosini
Beetles described in 1940